An Drochaid Museum was formed in 1980 and is located in Mabou, Nova Scotia. The museum and Mabou Gaelic and Historical Society was founded to catalogue and support Gaelic culture in the Mabou area. It also functions as keeping records of Mabou's history. Built in 1875, it served as a general store and lecture hall until the late-1970s, then in the 1980s the building was purchased and used to create a heritage museum. The museum also functions as a cultural center, giving step-dancing, fiddle and piano lessons, holding Gaelic-related events and workshops.

"An Drochaid" means "The Bridge" in Gaelic, which is the name Gaelic settlers gave Mabou.

References 

Museums in Inverness County, Nova Scotia
Ethnic museums in Canada
Scottish-Canadian culture
1980 establishments in Nova Scotia
Canadian Gaelic
Scottish Gaelic education
Museums established in 1980
Scottish diaspora museums